"Tell Me You Love Me" is a song recorded by American singer Demi Lovato. It was written by Kirby Lauryen, Stint and John Hill, with production handled by the latter two. The track was initially released through Hollywood, Island and Safehouse Records on August 24, 2017, as the first promotional single from Lovato's sixth studio album of the same name (2017). It was released as the second and final single from the album on November 14, 2017. Lyrically, the song uses relationship metaphors to reference theme of self-respect.

"Tell Me You Love Me" received acclaim from music critics, who praised its production and Lovato's vocals. The song impacted hot adult contemporary radios on January 22, 2018. Commercially, the song reached the top 40 in Canada and the top 20 in Panama.

Production
"Tell Me You Love Me" was written by Kirby Lauryen, Stint and John Hill for Lovato's sixth studio album of the same name. It was produced by Stint and Hill. Both producers performed the instruments for the song, including bass, drums, guitar, horn, and piano. Mitch Allan also served as its vocal producer, with Scott Robinson contributing as the additional vocal producer. The song features backing vocals by Lauryen. It was recorded and edited with guidance by Rob Cohen at Rodeo Recordings, located in Santa Monica, California and Venice Way Studios in North Vancouver, Canada. Lovato recorded the vocals for the song with guidance by Zeke Mishanec at Jungle City Studios in New York City. The song was engineered for mix by John Hanes, and eventually mixed by Serban Ghenea. It was finally mastered by Chris Gehringer and Will Quinnell.

During the album pop-up exhibition in New York City, Lovato revealed that the song was "really stuck" with her when she heard it for the first time. She explained, "At the time I was going through a breakup. It's about the vulnerability of coming out of a very serious relationship and having a tough time with it. It also at the same time calls out a big misconception with the line, 'You ain't nobody 'til you got somebody,' which again comes from that vulnerability with mixed emotions." In an interview with the BBC, Lovato named "Tell Me You Love Me" as her favorite track on the album, later explaining that "It said exactly what I was wanting to tell that person. I wanted to hear them tell me that they loved me."

Release
Lovato published a black-and-white teaser on August 23, 2017, on social media, announcing the new album, with "Tell Me You Love Me" playing in the background. The clip shows Lovato singing the song in a studio, as it fades into the album artwork. It was released to radio as the album's second and final single from the album on November 14, 2017. An official remix of the song by NOTD was released on December 15, 2017. The second official remix of the song by American electronic musician Dave Audé was released on January 5, 2018. On March 8, 2018, Lovato released a remix extended play, featuring the original version of the track, the two previous remixes, Spanglish and Spanish versions and a live acoustic performance. On March 23, 2018, the EP was re-released, and one remix of the song by Matrix & Futurebound was released.

Composition
"Tell Me You Love Me" is written in the key of E minor with a tempo of 72 beats per minute in common time. The song follows a chord progression of Em–D–C, and Lovato's vocal range spans from the low note of A3 to the high note of G5.

Critical reception
"Tell Me You Love Me" received acclaim from music critics, who mostly complimented its production and Lovato's vocals. Elias Leight of Rolling Stone called the song "a swelling ballad full of horns and handclaps". Mike Wass of Idolator described the song as "a fiery mid-tempo anthem". Jeff Benjamin of Fuse called the song a "booming ballad". Deepa Lakshmin of MTV News described Lovato's vocals as "sweeping". Raisa Bruner of Time described the song as a "lush and dramatic love song" that had "powerful hand-clap chorus and big horns". While reviewing the album, Jamieson Cox of Pitchfork described the song as "a desperate plea for affection that gradually morphs into a declaration of self-love".

Music video

Background and synopsis

The music video for "Tell Me You Love Me" was directed by Mark Pellington, who had previously worked with Lovato on the video for her 2011 single "Skyscraper". The video co-starred actor Jesse Williams. About filming the music video, Lovato commented, "[Shooting the music video] was really fun too! We had a full on wedding and my best friends were even my bridesmaids and groomsmen."

The music video is six minutes and forty-seven seconds long. The first two minutes of the video are dedicated to the couple's engagement as well as the jealousies that strain their relationship before their wedding. The track eventually begins during the wedding sequence where, after a few suspenseful moments, Williams' groom tells Lovato's bride he is not ready and leaves her at the altar to the shock of their family and friends. The video ends with Lovato singing "Everything I need, is standing right in front of me, I know that we will be alright, alright" as she stands in front of a mirror.

Release and reception
On November 22, 2017, Lovato posted a photo of herself in a wedding dress on her social media with no description. Rumors of the possibility of the photo being a sneak peek from the music video were made on social media. On November 27, 2017, Lovato announced that the official music video for the song would be released on December 1, 2017, by posting a wedding invitation from Lovato and Williams. According to Island Records' president David Massey, the music video reached 10 million views on its first day.

Megan Armstrong of Billboard praised Lovato and Williams' acting performances, saying they "make it hard to believe they aren't actually a couple in real life." Markos Papadatos of Digital Journal said the music video was "superb from start to finish" and called it one of Lovato's "most compelling videos". Sara M Moniuszko of USA Today praised the music video as one that "perfectly matches the emotional and longing lyrics of the track." Kaitlyn Tiffany of The Verge described the video as "a Lifetime movie you can watch at your desk". Idolator listed the video 11th among the best music videos of the year.

Live performances
On October 5, 2017, the singer performed the song for the first time on television on The Today Show, where she also performed "Sorry Not Sorry". On November 10, 2017, Lovato performed the song at BBC's Sounds Like Friday Night. On November 12, 2017, Lovato performed a medley of "Sorry Not Sorry" and "Tell Me You Love Me" at the 2017 MTV Europe Music Awards. The song was on Lovato's set list for the 2017 Jingle Ball Tour. On December 19, 2017, Lovato performed the song on the live finale of The Voice. Lovato performed the track on The Ellen DeGeneres Show on January 15, 2018. The song serves as the encore to the Tell Me You Love Me World Tour, where Lovato sings accompanied by a guest choir while confetti is raining down.

Track listings
Digital download
 "Tell Me You Love Me" – 3:56

Digital download – NOTD Remix
"Tell Me You Love Me"  – 3:00

Digital download – Dave Audé Remix
"Tell Me You Love Me"  – 3:45

Digital download – Remixes
"Tell Me You Love Me" – 3:56
"Tell Me You Love Me"  – 3:46
"Tell Me You Love Me"  – 3:01
"Tell Me You Love Me"  – 3:57
"Tell Me You Love Me"  – 3:58
"Tell Me You Love Me"  – 2:37
"Tell Me You Love Me"  – 3:28

Credits and personnel
Recording and management
Recorded at Rodeo Recordings (Santa Monica, California) and Venice Way Studios (North Vancouver, BC, Canada)
Vocals recorded at Jungle City Studios (New York City)
Mixed at MixStar Studios (Virginia Beach, Virginia)
Mastered at Sterling Sound Studios (New York City)
Published by Rodeoman Music (GMR), EMI April Music, WB Music Corp. (ASCAP), Roc Nation Music (ASCAP), A Song A Day (ASCAP), Stint Music Publishing (SOCAN)

Personnel
Demi Lovato – lead vocals
John Hill – production, bass, drums, guitar, horn, piano, programming
Stint – production, bass, drums, guitar, horn, piano, programming
Mitch Allan – vocal production
Scott Robinson – additional vocal production
Rob Cohen – recording, editing
Zeke Mishanec – vocals recording
Serban Ghenea – mixing
John Hanes – mixing engineering
Dave Palmer – keyboards
Kirby Lauryen – background vocals
Chris Gehringer – mastering
Will Quinnell – mastering

Credits adapted from the liner notes of Tell Me You Love Me.

Charts

Weekly charts

Year-end charts

Certifications

Release history

Notes

References

2010s ballads
2017 singles
2017 songs
Demi Lovato songs
Hollywood Records singles
Island Records singles
Safehouse Records singles
Gospel songs
Pop ballads
Contemporary R&B ballads
Songs written by John Hill (record producer)
Music videos directed by Mark Pellington
Torch songs
Songs written by Ajay Bhattacharya
Songs written by Kirby Lauryen
Song recordings produced by Mitch Allan